Samuel Fagemo (born 14 March 2000) is a Swedish professional ice hockey player currently playing with the Ontario Reign in the American Hockey League (AHL) as a prospect under contract with the Los Angeles Kings of the National Hockey League (NHL). He was selected by the Kings in the second round, 50th overall, of the 2019 NHL Entry Draft.

Playing career
During his Under 15 season, Fagemo won a silver medal at the TV-pucken, a Swedish national ice hockey tournament.

The following season, Fagemo was called up Frölunda HC J20 where he scored in his debut on 22 October 2016, to help Frölunda beat Rögle BK 4–2. However, during the 2016–17 season Fagemo incurred a wrist injury as a result of an accidental collision with a teammate. He was forced to miss five months to recover.

Fagemo made his Swedish Hockey League (SHL) debut in 2017, playing two games with Frölunda HC in the 2017–18 season.

Although Fagemo went undrafted into the National Hockey League, he was invited to the Arizona Coyotes development camp prior to the 2018–19 season as a free agent. While attending their development camp, Fagemo was drafted by the Halifax Mooseheads of the Canadian Hockey League (CHL) in the 2018 CHL Import Draft. He became the first Swedish player since 1994 to be drafted by the Mooseheads.

During the 2018–19 season, Fagemo scored his first SHL goal on 13 October 2018 against Färjestad BK. During the 2018–19 Champions Hockey League, Fagemo scored a hat trick in a 6–0 win over the Aalborg Pirates. In 42 regular season games, Fagemo registered 14 goals and 25 points. He finished his rookie season, leading all first-year players with 6 playoff goals and tied for the rookie lead in points during the postseason with 10 to help Frölunda HC win the Le Mat Trophy.

On 21 June 2019, Fagemo was selected by the Los Angeles Kings in the second round, 50th overall, in the 2019 NHL Entry Draft. After attending the Kings development camp, on 11 July 2019, Fagemo was signed to a three-year, entry-level contract with Los Angeles.

International play

Fagemo was selected for Team Sweden to compete at the 2016 World U-17 Hockey Challenge. There he scored seven points in six games to be named to the U17 WHC All-Star Team, and win a gold medal.

Fagemo then participated in the 2017 Ivan Hlinka Memorial Tournament and 2018 IIHF World U18 Championships where he helped Sweden win a bronze medal in both tournaments.

On 26 December 2018, Fagemo was selected for Team Sweden's 2019 World Junior Ice Hockey Championships roster.

Personal life
Fagemo's father is former professional SHL player Linus Fagemo.

Career statistics

Regular season and playoffs

International

Awards and honours

References

External links
 

2000 births
Living people
Frölunda HC players
Los Angeles Kings draft picks
Los Angeles Kings players
Ontario Reign (AHL) players
Södertälje SK players
Ice hockey people from Gothenburg
Swedish ice hockey right wingers